Barbara Müller or Mueller may refer to:

 Barbara Mueller (athlete) (born 1933), American hurdler
 Barbara Warren (1943–2008), née Müller, Austrian-American counselor, model, actress, author, and triathlete
 Barbara R. Mueller (1925–2016), American philatelist
 Barbara Müller (rower) (born 1937), East German rower
 Barbara Müller (footballer) (born 1983), German footballer in 2002 FIFA U-19 Women's World Championship